The House of Moltke is the name of an old German noble family. The family was originally from Mecklenburg, but apart from Germany, some of the family branches also resided throughout Scandinavia. Members of the family have been noted as statesmen, high-ranking military officers and major landowners in Denmark and Prussia.

History 
The family is descended from Fridericus Meltiko, a knight from Mecklenburg who lived in the mid 13th century. The family was awarded with the title of Count on 13.12.1834 in Denmark. They were also created Counts in Prussia on 17.2.1868 by King William I of Prussia.

People
 Adam Gottlob Moltke  (1710–1792), Danish courtier, statesman and diplomat
  (1738–1800), Danish general
 Joachim Godske Moltke (1746–1818), Prime Minister of Denmark, son of Adam Gottlob Moltke
 Friedrich Philipp Victor von Moltke (1768–1845), German Generalleutnant in Danish service
 Adam Wilhelm Moltke (1785–1864), Danish Prime Minister, son of Joachim Godske Moltke
 Helmuth von Moltke the Elder (1800–1891), Chief of the Prussian, and then German, General Staff
 Adam Friedrich Adamson von Moltke (1816–1885), Danish administrative lawyer and district president 
 Kuno von Moltke (1847–1923), German general
 Helmuth von Moltke the Younger (1848–1916), Chief of the German General Staff
 Otto von Moltke (1851–1881), German-Danish military officer
 Heinrich Karl Leonhard von Moltke (1854–1922), German-Danish vice admiral in the Imperial German Navy
 Harald Moltke (1871–1960), Danish painter and Arctic explorer
 Hans-Adolf von Moltke (1884–1943), German diplomat
 Else Moltke (1888–1986), Danish writer and feminist
 Erik Moltke (1901–1984), Danish art historian
 Helmuth James Graf von Moltke (1907–1945), German jurist, pacifist, head of the anti-Nazi Kreisau Circle, executed for treason for hosting a group planning to create a democracy after the fall of the Third Reich
 Gebhardt von Moltke (1938-2019), German diplomat
 James von Moltke (1970– ), German banker, current Chief Financial Officer of Deutsche Bank. 
 Carl Moltke (1869-1935), German-born Danish politician and ambassador.
 Count Carl Adam Moltke (1908–1989), Member of the Danish Mission to the United Nations
 Alexandra Isles (1945-) (née Moltke), Soap opera actress, model, and former mistress of Claus von Bülow.

Places
Cape Harald Moltke, North Greenland
Cape Moltke, SE Greenland

References

Literature

 Ernst Heinrich Kneschke: Neues allgemeines deutsches Adels-Lexicon. Friedrich Voigt, Leipzig 1859
 Olaf Jessen: Die Moltkes. Biographie einer Familie. C. H. Beck, München 2010,  (Rezension)
 Ernst Münch: "Die Moltkes im Ringen um ihr Stammgut Toitenwinkel bei Rostock". In: Herrschaft. Machtentfaltung über adligen und fürstlichen Grundbesitz in der Frühen Neuzeit. Böhlau Verlag, Köln Weimar 2003, S. 3–26
 Jochen Thies: Die Moltkes: Von Königgrätz nach Kreisau. Eine deutsche Familiengeschichte. Piper Verlag, München 2010, 
 Genealogisches Handbuch des Adels, Adelslexikon Band IX, Band 116 der Gesamtreihe, C. A. Starke Verlag, Limburg (Lahn) 1998, 

Danish noble families
German noble families
Swedish unintroduced nobility
 
Military families of Germany